Sefiu Adegbenga Kaka (born 14 May 1952) is a Nigerian politician who was elected Senator for Ogun East in the 9 April 2011 national elections, running on the Action Congress of Nigeria (ACN) ticket. He previously served as deputy governor of Ogun State from 1999 to 2003.

Early life and education
Sefiu Adegbenga Kaka was born on 14 May 1952, to a pious Muslim family, and entered Ijebu Muslim College in 1968.
Kaka was Deputy Governor of Ogun State from 1999 to 2003, during the governorship of Olusegun Osoba.

Senatorial career
In the 9 April 2011 election, Kaka was elected Senator of Ogun East with 76,543 votes, ahead of the People's Democratic Party (PDP) candidate Toheeb Odunowo with 52,613 votes and the Peoples Party of Nigeria (PPN) candidate, Prince Abiodun Odusanya, with 46,148 votes.

References

Members of the Senate (Nigeria)
People from Ogun State
1952 births
Living people
Yoruba politicians